The Democratic Action Party of DAP-K is a political party in Kenya led by Wafula Wamunyinyi.

History 
The party was one of 23 that contested the 2022 Kenyan general election as part of the Azimio La Umoja alliance. They had 61 candidates but only 5 were elected to the 13th Parliament of Kenya.

References

See also 

 List of political parties in Kenya

Political parties in Kenya